Bold is a font style used for emphasis.

Bold or BOLD may also refer to:
 Boldness, or being bold, courage, the opposite of being shy

Military
 HMS Bold (1801), a gun-brig that ran aground and was broken up in 1811
 HMS Bold (1812), a gun-brig that was wrecked in 1813
 HMS Manly (1804) or HMS Bold, a ship that was sold in 1814
 USS Bold (BAT-8) or HMS Bold (W114), a tugboat transferred to the United Kingdom in 1942
 USS Bold (AMc-67), a minesweeper laid down in 1941
 USS Bold (AM-424), a minesweeper launched in 1953
 USNS Bold (T-AGOS-12)
 Bold (decoy), a German World War II sonar decoy

Places
 Bold, St Helens, a civil parish in Merseyside, England
 Bold Cove, Falkland Islands
 Bold Street, Liverpool
 Bold Park, an urban bushland area in Perth, Western Australia
 Bold (river), a tributary of the Buzău in Romania

Television
 bold (TV channel), a Canadian television channel
 10 Bold, an Australian television channel
 The Bold and the Beautiful or Bold, a TV soap opera

Other uses
 Bold (band), an American hardcore punk band
 Bold (book) or Bold: How to Go Big, Create Wealth, and Impact the World, a book by Peter Diamandis
 Bold (detergent), a brand of laundry detergent
 Bold (EP), by Mary Lambert, 2017
 Bold (horse), an American Thoroughbred racehorse
 Bold (surname), a surname (and list of people with the surname)
 Barcode of Life Data System (BOLD), a DNA sequence database
 Biological Oxidant and Life Detection (BOLD), a proposed spacecraft 
 Black Organization for Leadership Development, a Louisiana political group
 BlackBerry Bold, a smartphone
 Blood-oxygen-level dependent, a method used in functional magnetic resonance imaging
 Bolad (given name) or Bold, an Inner Asian given name
 Bureau of Legal Dentistry, a forensic dentistry organization in Vancouver, British Columbia

See also
 List of people known as the Bold